Suatisi is a hamlet  in the historical region of Khevi, north-eastern Georgia. It is located on the right bank of the eponymous river Suatisi, on the southern slopes of the Khokh Range. Administratively, it is part of the Kazbegi Municipality in Mtskheta-Mtianeti. Distance to the municipality center Stepantsminda is 38 km.
Hamlet was named after the Suatisi mountain, elevation , located upstream of the Suatisi.

Population 
According to the 2014 census, no one lives in the village anymore.

See also 
Suatisi lake
Suatisi glacier

Sources 
 Georgian Soviet Encyclopedia, V. 9, p. 588, Tbilisi, 1985 year.

References

Kobi Community villages